Edita Malovčić (born 21 January 1978), known by her stage name, Madita, is an Austrian singer and actress of Bosnian descent. Her father is Bosnian folk singer Kemal Malovčić. Madita's music ranges from synth-pop to R&B to jazz.

Early life
Born Edita Malovčić in Vienna, she is the daughter of Bosnian folk singer
Kemal Malovčić from his first marriage, to a Serbian woman. Madita has stated that she has not been in contact with her father for many years, and that she has "no good memories" of him.

Career

Acting
Malovčić studied musicology and took private acting lessons. In 1999, she acted in the Austrian film Northern Skirts, about the Bosnian War, which won several awards. After her first success, she went on to act in numerous other films, such as Berlin is in Germany (2001), Kaltfront (2003), Želary (2003), and Four Minutes (2006). She has also appeared in various television series, including Medicopter 117, Tatort, and most recently, Capitani.

Music
Malovčić first sang in 2002, when she performed with the duo dZihan & Kamien on their album Gran Riserva. Her first solo record, Madita, was released in 2005. It reached the top 3 of the Electronic Album Chart on the iTunes Music Store. In 2007, her song "Ceylon" was featured on an episode of Damages.

In 2008, Madita released her second album, Too. Two years later, she issued Flavours, a nine-track album with five previously unreleased songs, and four remixed tracks. The record was part of a larger collection, titled Madita Deluxe, which includes most of the singer's songs.

Discography

 Madita (2005)
 Too (2008)
 Pacemaker (2010)
 Madita Deluxe (2012)
 Flavours (2012)

Filmography

Film

Television

References

External links

 

1978 births
21st-century Austrian actresses
21st-century Austrian women singers
Living people
Actresses from Vienna
Austrian film actresses
Austrian people of Bosniak descent
Austrian people of Serbian descent
Contemporary R&B singers
English-language singers from Austria
Funk singers
Musicians from Vienna
Nu jazz musicians
Soul singers
Trip hop musicians
Women in electronic music